SIDERPERU is a Peruvian steel and iron company and controlled by Gerdau, a Brazilian siderurgy company.

The company was founded in 1956 in Chimbote city. The steel complex is set in a 600 hectares large site and has a production capacity of more than 500 tons of steel products. It includes a blast furnace, the only one in Peru, and several electric arc furnaces that produce steel sponges. Since its foundation the company is the largest in its sector in Peru.

See also
Chimbote

References

External links
 Official Website

Manufacturing companies of Peru